{{DISPLAYTITLE:C18H17FN2O}}
The molecular formula C18H17FN2O (molar mass: 296.339 g/mol, exact mass: 296.1325 u) may refer to:

 Didesmethylcitalopram
 Fluproquazone

Molecular formulas